The United States has 22 Air Route Traffic Control Centers (ARTCC). They are operated by and are part of the Federal Aviation Administration of the U.S. Department of Transportation. An ARTCC controls aircraft flying in a specified region of airspace, known as a flight information region (FIR), typically during the en route portion of flight. The purpose of control is to promote the safe, orderly, and expeditious flow of air traffic and prevent collisions. In countries other than the U.S., such a facility is generally known as an area control center.

Albuquerque Air Route Traffic Control Center

Anchorage Air Route Traffic Control Center

Atlanta Air Route Traffic Control Center

Boston Air Route Traffic Control Center

Chicago Air Route Traffic Control Center

Cleveland Air Route Traffic Control Center

Denver Air Route Traffic Control Center

Fort Worth Air Route Traffic Control Center

Honolulu Air Route Traffic Control Center

Houston Air Route Traffic Control Center

Indianapolis Air Route Traffic Control Center

Jacksonville Air Route Traffic Control Center

Kansas City Air Route Traffic Control Center

Los Angeles Air Route Traffic Control Center

Memphis Air Route Traffic Control Center

Miami Air Route Traffic Control Center

Minneapolis Air Route Traffic Control Center

New York Air Route Traffic Control Center

Oakland Air Route Traffic Control Center

Salt Lake City Air Route Traffic Control Center

Seattle Air Route Traffic Control Center

Washington Air Route Traffic Control Center

See also
List of area control centers

References

External links
Air Route Traffic Control AVweb

Air traffic control centers